Pinkerton Road Studio is an American video game developer based in Mount Joy, Pennsylvania. The company is responsible for creating Moebius: Empire Rising and the remake of Gabriel Knight: Sins of the Fathers. Jane Jensen, the creator behind the Gabriel Knight: Sins of the Fathers and Gray Matter,established Pinkerton Road Studio in 2012 along with Robert Holmes to focus on graphic adventure games.

On 10 April 2012, Jane Jensen solicited a Kickstarter campaign to fund development of three games, including 'Gray Matter 2', "Anglophile Adventure", and "Moebius". The campaign attracted 5,836 backers, raising a total of $435,316 in funding - $135,316 over the initial goal of $300,000.

On October 8, 2013, Jensen revealed that Mystery Game X was Gabriel Knight: Sins of the Fathers: 20th Anniversary Edition, a remake of the original Gabriel Knight: Sins of the Fathers released in 1993. The remake included improved graphics, remastered music, and new puzzles and gameplay. The remake was released on October 15, 2014, for Windows, Mac OS-X, Android and iOS.

On 29 April 2016, Pinkerton Road announced its forums would close on 6 May the same year, following the poor sales of Moebius: Empire Rising and Gabriel Knight: Sins of the Fathers: 20th Anniversary Edition.

Developed works
Gabriel Knight: Sins of the Fathers 20th Anniversary Edition
Moebius: Empire Rising
Lola and Lucy's Big Adventure

Cancelled
Anglophile Adventure
Gray Matter 2

References

External links
Pinkerton Road Studio web site

Companies based in Lancaster County, Pennsylvania
Video game companies established in 2012
Video game companies of the United States
Video game development companies
2012 establishments in Pennsylvania